Pucaraju or Pukaraju (possibly from Quechua puka red, rahu snow, ice, mountain with snow, "red snow-covered mountain") is a mountain in the Cordillera Blanca in the Andes of Peru, about  high. It is situated in the Ancash Region, Mariscal Luzuriaga Province, Lucma District, in the Pomabamba Province, Llumpa District, and in the Yungay Province, Yanama District. Pucaraju lies southeast of Taulliraju and west of the lakes named Wiqruqucha and Orgoncocha.

The IGN-Peru map and the UGEL map of Yungay show the name of the mountain as "Pacaraju".

References 

Mountains of Peru
Mountains of Ancash Region